Charlee Minkin (born November 13, 1981) is an American Olympic judoka. She won three national titles (2000, 2002, and 2004), and won the silver medal in the women's half lightweight division (–52 kg) at the 2003 Pan American Games. In 2011 she won the gold medal in Brazilian Jiu-Jitsu at the IBJJF Pan Am Championships.

Early and personal life
Minkin was born in Half Moon Bay, California. She is Jewish, was bat mitzvah, and attended Congregation Beth Israel-Judea in San Francisco. Her mother is Carolyn Minkin (a black belt), her father, former Green Beret Stephen Minkin, died in a plane crash when she was five years old, and she has three siblings, Zisa, Ben, and Davina (trained in Israel for a year with Olympic medalist Yael Arad). She attended Brandeis Hillel Day School in San Francisco. She then attended the University of Colorado Colorado Springs.

Judo career

Minkin has been coached by Ed Liddie.

In 1998 she won the silver medal in the Pan American U20 Championships (–52 kg). Minkin won three national titles (2000, 2002 (as her older sister Davina won the 57 kg gold medal), and 2004; –52 kg)) and five continental titles.

Minkin won the silver medal in the women's half lightweight division (–52 kg) at the 2003 Pan American Games in Santo Domingo, Dominican Republic.

She represented her native country at the age of 22 at the 2004 Summer Olympics in Women's 52 kg in Athens, Greece.

Career after judo
In 2005, she began a career as a personal trainer. In 2007, Minkin began working as a police agent for the Lakewood, Colorado, Police Department. In 2009, she began to train in Brazilian Jiu-Jitsu and won the gold medal at the 2011 IBJJF Pan Am Championships.

See also
List of select Jewish judokas

References

 

1981 births
Living people
American female judoka
Judoka at the 2003 Pan American Games
Judoka at the 2004 Summer Olympics
Olympic judoka of the United States
People from Half Moon Bay, California
Sportspeople from San Francisco
Pan American Games silver medalists for the United States
Pan American Games medalists in judo
Jewish martial artists
Jewish American sportspeople
University of Colorado Colorado Springs alumni
American women police officers
Jewish American police officers
American practitioners of Brazilian jiu-jitsu
Female Brazilian jiu-jitsu practitioners
Medalists at the 2003 Pan American Games
21st-century American Jews
21st-century American women